Calvin is a masculine given name.  It has been particularly popular among American Protestants, who may be baptized as John Calvin to honor the religious leader, although in the judgement of the Oxford Dictionary of First Names, the modern given name "owes its popularity as much to the New York fashion designer Calvin Klein [b. 1942] as to the theologian".

Notable people with this name include:

 Calvin Abrams (1924–1997), Major League Baseball outfielder
 Calvin Abueva (born 1988), Filipino professional basketball player
 Calvin Anderson (born 1996), American football player
 Calvin Andrew (born 1986), English footballer
 Calvin Ashford (–2008), African-American interior designer
 Calvin Borel (b. 1966), thoroughbred horse jockey
 Calvin Broadus, or his stage name Snoop Dogg (b. 1971), American rapper
 Calvin Chen (b. 1980), member of the Taiwanese boyband Fahrenheit
 Calvin Cheng (b. 1975), fashion mogul
 Calvin Galusha Coolidge (1815–1878), American politician, father of the 30th U.S. president
 John Calvin Coolidge (1872–1933), 30th President of the United States
 Calvin Gotlieb (1921–2016), Canadian professor
 Calvin Harris (b. 1984), Scottish electro musician/singer
 Calvin Hill (b. 1947), former NFL player
 Calvin Isufi (b. 2001), Albanian footballer
 Calvin Johnson (musician), frontman of Beat Happening and owner of indie label K Records
 Calvin Johnson (American football) (b. 1985), National Football League player
 Calvin Klein (fashion designer) (b. 1942)
 Calvin "C. J." Miles, Jr. (b. 1987), current National Basketball Association player
 Calvin Miller (b. 1998), Scottish footballer
 Calvin Miller (b. 1996), American runner
 Calvin Murphy (b. 1948), former National Basketball Association player
 Calvin Peete (1943–2015), American professional golfer
 Calvin Petrie (b. 1984), Montserratian international footballer
 Calvin Pickard (b. 1992), National Hockey League goaltender
 Calvin Ridley (b. 1994), American football player
 Calvin Ripken, Jr. (b. 1960), former Major League Baseball player
 Calvin Ripken, Sr. (1935–1999), former Major League Baseball player
 Calvin Robinson, British political commentator and clergyman
 Calvin Royal III (b. 1988/89), American ballet dancer
 Calvin Schrage (b. 1991), American politician
 Calvin Simon (1942–2022), American musician
 Calvin Smith (b. 1961), American former sprint track and field athlete
 Calvin Thomas (1854–1919), American scholar 
 Calvin Trillin (b. 1935), writer
 Calvin Throckmorton (b. 1996), American football player
 Calvin Wooster (1771–1798), American circuit rider
Fictional characters
 Calvin (Calvin and Hobbes), a main character of the retired comic strip Calvin and Hobbes
 Calvin Cambridge, main character in the 2002 film Like Mike
 Calvin Candie, character in the 2012 film Django Unchained 
 Calvin Valentine, a character in the soap opera Hollyoaks
 Calvin Zabo, Mister Hyde, supervillain in Marvel Comics
 Calvin, the titular alien in the 2017 film Life
 Calvin Maxwell, one of the protagonists in Power Rangers Ninja Steel
 Calvin Fischoder, character from animated series, Bob's Burgers

References

External links
Behind the Name: Calvin

English masculine given names
French masculine given names
German masculine given names
Dutch masculine given names
Irish masculine given names